Cypridocopina is a suborder of ostracods in the order Podocopida. It is divided into three superfamilies – Cypridoidea, Macrocypridoidea and Pontocypridoidea.

References

Podocopida
Arthropod suborders